{{Infobox person
| image        = Bill Arkin at University of Denver.jpg
| caption      = Arkin in 2019
| birth_name   = William Morris Arkin
| birth_date   = <ref>U.S. Public Records Index, Vols. 1 & 2 (Provo, UT: Ancestry.com Operations, Inc.), 2010.</ref>
| birth_place  = New York City, New York, U.S.
| occupation   = Political commentator, activist, journalist
| years_active = 
| spouse       = 
| website      = https://williamaarkin.wordpress.com/
}}
William M. Arkin (born May 15, 1956) is an American political commentator, best-selling author, journalist, activist, blogger, and former United States Army soldier. He has previously served as a military affairs analyst for the Los Angeles Times, The Washington Post, and The New York Times.

Biography
Arkin was born in New York City in 1956. After attending public school in Manhattan, he briefly attended New York University before dropping out to enlist in the military shortly after his 18th birthday.

Work

Arkin served in U.S. Army intelligence from 1974 to 1978, and was stationed in West Berlin. After leaving the Army,  co-authored four volumes of the Nuclear Weapons Databook series for the Natural Resources Defense Council, reference books on nuclear weapons. Volume II revealed locations of all U.S. and foreign nuclear bases worldwide and was condemned by the Reagan Administration. The administration sought the jailing of Arkin for revealing the locations of American (and Soviet) nuclear weapons around the world. His subsequent revelation of “mini-nuke” research efforts by the Pentagon in 1992 led to a 1994 Congressional ban and ultimately a pledge by the U.S. government not to develop new nuclear weapons. His discovery of secret U.S. plans to secretly move nuclear weapons to a number of overseas locations involved governments from Bermuda to Iceland to the Philippines.

Arkin led Greenpeace International's research and action effort on the first Gulf War, being the first American military analyst to visit post-war Iraq in 1991, and the first to write about cluster bombs and about civilian casualties and the cascading effects of the bombing of electrical power.

Arkin was also founding member of the Arms Project of Human Rights Watch and wrote their first comprehensive report on cluster bombs. He then provided an analysis of the causes of civilian casualties after the Kosovo war (1999).  Arkin has also visited war zones in the former Yugoslavia, Lebanon, Afghanistan, Eritrea and Israel on behalf of governments, the United Nations and independent inquiries.

From 1985 until 2002, he wrote a column in the Bulletin of the Atomic Scientists called the "Last Word", and co-authored a bi-monthly publication by the Natural Resources Defense Council called the "Nuclear Notebook."

He has served as an independent consultant and held positions at the Institute for Policy Studies, Center for Defense Information, Greenpeace and Human Rights Watch.

He has worked as an NBC News military analyst and written columns for the Los Angeles Times, Washington Post and the New York Times (from 1998 until January, 2003 it was the Dot.Mil column).

From 2007 to 2008, he was a Policy Fellow at Harvard Kennedy School in the Carr Centre for Human Rights Policy at Harvard University. From 1992 to 2008, he also was a lecturer adjunct professor at the School of Advanced Air and Space Studies, U.S. Air Force, Maxwell AFB, Alabama.

On October 15, 2003, Arkin released video and audiotapes documenting General William Boykin's framing of the "War on Terrorism" in religious terms in speeches at churches. Arkin followed up with a Los Angeles Times op-ed piece that accused the general of being "an intolerant extremist" and a man "who believes in Christian 'jihad'."

In February 2007, Arkin responded to an NBC Nightly News report on U.S. soldiers in Iraq who said they were frustrated by antiwar sentiment at home, and especially by people who say they support the troops, but not the war. In his Washington Post blog, Arkin wrote, "We pay the soldiers a decent wage, take care of their families, provide them with housing and medical care and vast social support systems and ship obscene amenities into the war zone for them, we support them in every possible way, and their attitude is that we should in addition roll over and play dead, defer to the military and the generals and let them fight their war, and give up our rights and responsibilities to speak up because they are above society?"

Arkin is co-author of Top Secret America: The Rise of the New American Security State (Little Brown), a New York Times and Washington Post best-selling non-fiction book based on a four-part 2010 series Arkin worked on with Dana Priest. Top Secret America won the 2012 Constitutional Commentary Award from the Constitution Project. The book and series are the results of a three-year investigation into the shadows of the enormous system of military, intelligence and corporate interests created in the decade after the September 11 terrorist attacks. The series was accompanied by The Washington Post'''s largest ever online presentation, earned the authors the George Polk Award for National Reporting, the Sigma Delta Chi Society of Professional Journalists award for Public Service, was a Goldsmith Prize for Investigative Reporting finalist and Pulitzer Prize nominee, as well as recipient of a half dozen other major journalism awards.

Arkin has advised the Office of the Secretary of Defense, the CIA, various offices on the Air Staff and various senior service schools and war colleges, the Office of the Chief of Naval Operations, naval intelligence, the United States Air Forces Central Command, the Defense Intelligence Agency, the National Photographic Interpretation Center, the Joint Warfare Analysis Center, and various "Lessons Learned" projects (Operation Enduring Look, the Gulf War Air Power Survey (GWAPS), Center for Naval Analysis). He has also been a consultant on Iraq to the office of the Secretary-General of the United Nations.

On January 4, 2019, Arkin resigned from NBC News.

Bibliography

References

External links
Early Warning: Arkin's blog at the Washington Post
Interview on Liberadio
Arkin's Blog on Wordpress
 

1956 births
Living people
American male bloggers
American bloggers
American military writers
American political writers
American male writers
United States Army soldiers
University of Maryland, College Park alumni
Harvard Fellows
American anti–nuclear weapons activists
People from Pomfret, Vermont
21st-century American non-fiction writers